David E. Meyer (born in Louisville, Kentucky,  February 3, 1943) is an American academic in the field of psychology. He is a professor at the University of Michigan and is Chair of the Cognition and Cognitive Neuroscience area of the Psychology Department. He is director of the university's Brain, Cognition, and Action laboratory.

He received a B.A. in psychology from Wittenberg University in 1964.  He received an M.A. in mathematics in 1966 and a Ph.D. in Mathematical Psychology in 1969 from the University of Michigan. After earning his Ph.D., he worked with Saul Sternberg at Bell Labs before returning to the faculty of the Psychology Department of the University of Michigan in 1977.

With Roger W. Schvaneveldt he developed the lexical decision task to investigate semantic memory.  More recently he developed the EPIC cognitive architecture with David Kieras.

He is a Fellow of the Society of Experimental Psychologists, American Psychological Society, American Psychological Association, American Association for the Advancement of Science and the National Academy of Sciences.

References

External links
 Biography page, University of Michigan

Living people
1943 births
People from Louisville, Kentucky
University of Michigan faculty
University of Michigan alumni
Wittenberg University alumni
Members of the United States National Academy of Sciences
21st-century American psychologists
Fellows of the American Association for the Advancement of Science
Fellows of the American Psychological Association
Fellows of the Association for Psychological Science
Fellows of the Society of Experimental Psychologists
20th-century American psychologists